The British Transport Commission (BTC) was created by Clement Attlee's post-war Labour government as a part of its nationalisation programme, to oversee railways, canals and road freight transport in Great Britain (Northern Ireland had the separate Ulster Transport Authority). Its general duty under the Transport Act 1947 was to provide an efficient, adequate, economical and properly integrated system of public inland transport and port facilities within Great Britain for passengers and goods, excluding transport by air.

The BTC came into operation on 1 January 1948. Its first chairman was Lord Hurcomb, with Miles Beevor as Chief Secretary. Its main holdings were the networks and assets of the Big Four national regional railway companies: the Great Western Railway, London and North Eastern Railway, London, Midland and Scottish Railway and the Southern Railway. It also took over 55 other railway undertakings, 19 canal undertakings and 246 road haulage firms, as well as the work of the London Passenger Transport Board, which was already publicly owned. The nationalisation package also included the fleets of 'private owner wagons', which industrial concerns had used to transport goods on the railway networks.

Organisation
The BTC was one of the largest industrial organisations in the world, at one time employing nearly 688,000 people. At first, the Commission did not directly operate transport services, which were the responsibility of the Commission's Executives. These bodies were separately appointed, and operated under what were termed 'schemes of delegation'. The Act provided for five Executives, covering Docks & Inland Waterways, Hotels, London Transport, Railways, and Road Transport. The Railway Executive traded as "British Railways". In 1949, Road Transport was divided into separate Road Haulage and Road Passenger Executives, though the latter proved short-lived.

The Commission's extensive activities included:
 British Transport Advertising sold space on premises and vehicles.
 Buses: the Tilling Group sold its bus interests to the BTC in September 1948, as did the Red and White Group in 1950. Midland General buses and trolleybuses were transferred by the British Electricity Authority. From the railway companies, the BTC also inherited non-controlling interests in many bus companies in the British Electric Traction Group. It also manufactured buses for its own use, through the subsidiaries Bristol Tramways (from 1955 Bristol Commercial Vehicles) and Eastern Coach Works. In London and the surrounding area, the BTC ran both the (red) London buses and the (green) country buses, including Green Line Coaches.
 Docks: British Transport Docks (today known as Associated British Ports), comprising 32 ports taken over from the railway companies.
 Films: the BTC had its own film production company, British Transport Films.
 Hotels & Catering: the former railway hotels and catering departments initially came under the control of the Railway Executive, but on 1 July 1948 they were transferred to the Hotels Executive. Between 1953 and 1963, they operated as British Transport Hotel and Catering Services; and in 1963 it became the British Transport Hotels.
 Museums: The BTC inherited the LNER's Railway Museum at York and appointed a Curator of Historical Relics to build up a national collection. Eventually, much of this collection was displayed at the Museum of British Transport at Clapham, south London. This closed in the early 1970s and was superseded by the National Railway Museum at York and the London Transport Museum (now in Covent Garden). The BTC also established the Stoke Bruerne Canal Museum.
 Police: the British Transport Commission Police (BTCP) – see British Transport Police for details and dates – was formed chiefly by the amalgamation of the various railway constabularies.
 Railways: British Railways, including ancillary activities like engineering workshops, and London Underground. The former LMS lines in Northern Ireland (see Northern Counties Committee) were sold to the Ulster Transport Authority in 1949.
 Road Haulage: the local road distribution networks of the pre-nationalisation rail companies, plus the removals company Pickfords, which the railways had owned jointly. These networks were later re-organised as British Road Services (BRS).
 Shipping: the former railway steamer services, primarily to France and Ireland and around the Scottish coast, and investments in Associated Humber Lines and the Atlantic Steam Navigation Company.
 Tramways: the South London tramways of London Transport, all of which were abandoned by 5 July 1952.
 Travel & Holidays: the travel agents Thomas Cook & Son.
 Waterways: canals and navigable rivers, mainly taken over from canal companies, like the Grand Union Canal Carrying Company and Fellows Morton & Clayton, but also including those bought out earlier by the pre-nationalisation railways. The Caledonian Canal was already state-owned. The canals are today run by the Canal and River Trust and Scottish Canals. As well as the canal infrastructure, BTC also managed canal carrying services.

The Commission was permitted to "secure the provision" of road passenger services, although it did not have the general powers of compulsory purchase of bus operators. To obtain specific powers of acquisition it had first to draw up, and get approval for, a 'Road Scheme', area by area. Only one was published, the North East Area Road Scheme, though work began on a second scheme, covering East Anglia. The NEARS was never confirmed, as it was fiercely opposed by private and municipal operators.

The quasi-federal structure of Commission and Executives proved to be an obstacle to integration and was largely abolished by the Conservative government with effect from 1 October 1953 (the London Transport Executive alone survived). On 1 January 1955, the railways were re-organised on the basis of six Area Railway Boards, which had a wide measure of operational autonomy under the Commission's overall supervision. The Commission took direct charge of the remaining assets, though these were significantly reduced by the Conservatives de-nationalising much of the road haulage sector. On 1 January 1955, separate managements were also set up for road haulage, hotels, docks and inland waterways.

Abolition
By the late 1950s the BTC was in serious financial difficulties, largely due to the economic performance of the railways. It was criticised as an overly bureaucratic system of administering transport services and had failed to develop an integrated transport system (such as integrated ticketing and timetabling). It was abolished by Harold Macmillan's Conservative government under the Transport Act 1962 and replaced by five successor bodies:
British Railways Board (railways, hotels and some shipping)
British Transport Docks Board (docks)
British Waterways Board (inland waterways)
London Transport Board (London buses and the London Underground)
Transport Holding Company (remaining interests, in shipping, travel and road transport)

These changes took effect on 1 January 1963. Notwithstanding the abolition of the BTC, the British Transport Police continues to exist, and the BTC heraldic shield is still displayed on the force's badge.

Chairmen
 1947 – 1953: Sir Cyril Hurcomb
 1953 – 1961: Gen. Sir Brian Robertson, Bt.
 1961 – 1965: Dr. Richard Beeching

Notes

See also

 Canals of the United Kingdom
 History of the British canal system
 Independent Transport Commission

References

 
1948 establishments in the United Kingdom
Organizations established in 1948
Austerity in the United Kingdom (1939–1954)